Uji (宇治) is a place in Kyoto Prefecture, Japan.

Uji may also refer to:
 Uji (clan) (氏), a Japanese kin group system of the Kofun period
 Uji (Being-Time) (有時), "Being-Time," a teaching of Zen master Dōgen
 Jaume I University, a university in Castellón de la Plana, Spain
 Uzi fly, or uji fly, any of a number of fly species that parasitize silkworms

See also
 Yuji (disambiguation)